Midland City is a town in Dale County, Alabama, United States. At the 2010 U.S. Census the population was 2,344. It incorporated in 1890. It is part of the Ozark Micropolitan Statistical Area.

History

2013 hostage standoff

On January 29, 2013, 65-year-old Vietnam War-era veteran Jimmy Lee Dykes climbed aboard a school bus and fatally shot the driver; he then abducted at random a five-year-old boy named Ethan, who was sitting at the closest seat. He took Ethan into an underground bunker, where he held him captive. About a week after the incident, FBI agents were able to storm the bunker, kill Dykes, and rescue Ethan.

Geography
Midland City is located in southeastern Dale County at  (31.307945, -85.490606). It is bordered to the east by the town of Napier Field, to the southeast by the city of Dothan, and to the west by the town of Pinckard. U.S. Route 231 passes through the town, leading northwest  to Ozark, the Dale County seat, and southeast  to the center of Dothan. Alabama State Route 134 passes through the center of Midland City, leading east  to Headland and west  to Newton via Pinckard.

Demographics

2000 census
At the 2000 census there were 1,703 people, 707 households, and 477 families in the town. The racial makeup of the town was 70.58% White, 25.19% Black or African American, 0.70% Native American, 0.35% Asian, 0.12% from other races, and 3.05% from two or more races. 0.76% of the population were Hispanic or Latino of any race.
Of the 707 households 34.5% had children under the age of 18 living with them, 40.7% were married couples living together, 21.4% had a female householder with no husband present, and 32.5% were non-families. 28.7% of households were one person and 10.5% were one person aged 65 or older. The average household size was 2.41 and the average family size was 2.93.

The age distribution was 29.7% under the age of 18, 8.6% from 18 to 24, 27.2% from 25 to 44, 21.6% from 45 to 64, and 12.9% 65 or older. The median age was 34 years. For every 100 females, there were 89.2 males. For every 100 females age 18 and over, there were 82.3 males.

The median household income was $20,000 and the median family income  was $24,474. Males had a median income of $26,927 versus $17,174 for females. The per capita income for the town was $11,438. About 26.0% of families and 30.8% of the population were below the poverty line, including 44.1% of those under age 18 and 22.2% of those age 65 or over.

2010 census
At the 2010 census there were 2,344 people, 944 households, and 636 families in the town. There were 1,014 housing units at an average density of 169 per square mile (65/km). The racial makeup of the town was 70.4% White, 23.3% Black or African American, 0.5% Native American, 0.4% Asian, 1.7% from other races, and 3.7% from two or more races. 4.1% of the population were Hispanic or Latino of any race.
Of the 944 households 32.9% had children under the age of 18 living with them, 37.6% were married couples living together, 22.4% had a female householder with no husband present, and 32.6% were non-families. 26.9% of households were one person and 7.5% were one person aged 65 or older. The average household size was 2.48 and the average family size was 2.98.

The age distribution was 28.0% under the age of 18, 10.8% from 18 to 24, 28.4% from 25 to 44, 22.4% from 45 to 64, and 10.5% 65 or older. The median age was 31.6 years. For every 100 females, there were 90.4 males. For every 100 females age 18 and over, there were 88.4 males.

The median household income was $29,591 and the median family income  was $39,071. Males had a median income of $33,305 versus $23,897 for females. The per capita income for the town was $16,283. About 26.7% of families and 27.0% of the population were below the poverty line, including 36.9% of those under age 18 and 11.0% of those age 65 or over.

2020 census

As of the 2020 United States census, there were 2,239 people, 818 households, and 465 families residing in the town.

Notable people
 Bobby Bright, U.S. congressman from Alabama
 Earl Hutto, congressman from Florida from 1979 to 1995
 Nathan Mathis, former state representative

In August 2016, Interim Mayor, Patsy Capshaw Skipper garnered national attention due to a racist Facebook comment.  When asked about the election by a Facebook friend, Patsy Capshaw Skipper replied, "I lost. The nigger won", referring to her opponent Joann Grimsley who was elected as Midland City's first black mayor.

See also
2013 Alabama bunker hostage crisis

References

External links 
 
 City-Data.com
 ePodunk: Profile for Midland City, Alabama, AL

Towns in Dale County, Alabama
Towns in Alabama
Enterprise–Ozark micropolitan area